Boivin (French: from bois vin "(you) drink wine" (from the Old French verb boire "to drink" + vin "wine") used as a nickname for a (heavy) drinker) is a surname from France. Boivin is a combination of the French words bois (verb boire "to drink") and vin, which mean "drink" and "wine" respectively. The surname refers to someone who drinks (too much) wine.

Persons in France
François de Boivin (died 1618), French chronicler
Jean-Marc Boivin (1951–1990), French mountaineer and BASE jumper born in Dijon
Jean Boivin the Younger or Jean Boivin de Villeneuve (1663–Paris), French writer, scholar and translator
Jeanne Poiret Boivin (1871-1959), French jewelry designer
Jérôme Boivin, film director (such as the 1989 horror film Baxter)
Louis Boivin, brother of Jean Boivin, born in 1649, died in 1724, member of the Academy of inscriptions
Louis Hyacinthe Boivin (1808-1852), French botanist with the standard author abbreviation "Boivin"
Marie Boivin (1773–1841), French midwife, inventor, and obstetrics writer
Michel Boivin, French historian and anthropologist who specializes in the Muslim world
Olivier Boivin (b. 1985), French sprint canoer

Persons in Canada
Arthur Boivin (died 1952), politician in Manitoba, Canada
Claude Boivin (born 1970), retired Canadian professional ice hockey player
François Boivin (born 1982), Canadian snowboarder
Françoise Boivin (born 1960), Canadian politician
Georges Henri Boivin (1882–1926), Canadian politician
Guillaume Boivin (born 1989), Canadian cyclist
Joseph Robert Bernard Boivin (1916–1985), Canadian botanist usually referred to as Bernard Boivin
Leo Boivin (born 1932), retired Canadian professional ice hockey defenseman
Nicole Boivin (born 1970), Canadian archaeological scientist
Pierre Boivin (born 1953), French Canadian businessman
Pierre-Horace Boivin, former mayor of Granby, Quebec
Roch Boivin (1912–1979), Canadian politician

Persons in United States
Harry D. Boivin (1904–1999), American lawyer and politician
Joseph Boivin, co-founder, first President of St.Mary's Bank, America's first credit union

References